Geoscincus is a monotypic genus of skinks: the only accepted species is Geoscincus haraldmeieri (Meier's skink).

Etymology
G. haraldmeieri is named after German herpetologist Harald Meier.

Geographic range
G. haraldmeieri is only known from two specimens collected near Coula, New Caledonia.

Habitat and conservation status
The habitat of G. haraldmeieri has since been substantially modified, and the present status of the species is unknown.

References

Further reading
Böhme W (1976). "Über die Gattung Eugongylus Fitzinger, mit Beschreibung einer neuen Art (Reptilia: Scincidae) [=About the genus Eugongylus Fitzinger, with description of a new species (Reptilia: Scincidae)]". Bonner zoologische Beiträge 27: 245–251. (Eugongylus haraldmeieri, new species, pp. 248–249 + photograph on p. 245). (in German).
Sadlier RA (1987). "A review of the scincid lizards of New Caledonia". Rec. Australian Mus. 39 (1): 1-66. (Geoscincus, new genus, p. 6; G. haraldmeieri, new combination, pp. 6–7, Figures 4–7).

Skinks
Monotypic lizard genera
Skinks of New Caledonia
Endemic fauna of New Caledonia
Taxa named by Ross Allen Sadlier